Derek Miles (born September 28, 1972) is an American pole vaulter, from Tea, South Dakota. A former pole vaulter for the University of South Dakota Track and Field team, Miles is currently an assistant coach for the Coyotes. In 2004, he placed seventh in the Summer Olympic Games in Athens, Greece. Miles was originally at fourth place in the 2008 Summer Olympic Games in Beijing, China, but Ukrainian Denys Yurchenko who originally finished third, was disqualified in November 2016 due to use of dehydrochlormethyltestosterone. On 17 April 2017, Derek Miles received the Olympic bronze medal.

His personal best vault is 5.85 metres, achieved in September 2008 in Berlin, Germany. The vault, completed next to the Brandenburg Gate, was part of a promotional competition for the 2009 World Championships in Athletics. Miles trains with Earl Bell in Jonesboro, Arkansas at Bell Athletics. He is represented by Karen Locke.

He attended Bella Vista High School in Fair Oaks, California.

Achievements

References

External links
 
 
 
 

1972 births
Living people
American male pole vaulters
Athletes (track and field) at the 2004 Summer Olympics
Athletes (track and field) at the 2008 Summer Olympics
Athletes (track and field) at the 2012 Summer Olympics
Olympic track and field athletes of the United States
World record holders in masters athletics
Track and field athletes from California
People from Fair Oaks, California
People from Lincoln County, South Dakota
USA Outdoor Track and Field Championships winners